

Listings

State
 Ohio – from Seneca ohi:yo’, "beautiful river".
 Ohio River

Counties

 Ashtabula County – from Lenape ashtepihəle, 'always enough (fish) to go around, to be given away'; contraction from apchi 'always' + tepi 'enough' + həle (verb of motion).
 City of Ashtabula
 Ashtabula River
 Coshocton County – derived from Unami Lenape Koshaxkink 'where there is a river crossing', probably adapted as Koshaxktun 'ferry' ('river-crossing device').
 Coshocton
 Cuyahoga County – originally Mohawk Cayagaga 'crooked river', possibly related to kayuha 'creek' or kahyonhowanen 'river'.
 Cuyahoga River
 Erie County
 Geauga County – Onondaga jyo’ä·gak, Seneca jo’ä·ka’, 'raccoon' (originally the name of the Grand River).
 Hocking County
 Licking County
 Mahoning County
 Miami County
 Great Miami River
 Muskingum County – Shawnee Mshkikwam 'swampy ground' (mshkikwi- 'swamp' + -am 'earth');
 Muskingum River 
 Ottawa County
 Pickaway County - Shawnee. Variant of the name of one of their subtribes, Pekowi.
 Sandusky County – from Wyandot saandusti meaning 'water (within water-pools)' or from andusti 'cold water'.
 City of Sandusky
 Sandusky Bay
 Sandusky River
 Scioto County – derived from Wyandot skɛnǫ·tǫ’, 'deer' (compare Shenandoah, also derived from the word for deer in a related Iroquoian language).
 Scioto River
 Seneca County
 Senecaville
 Tuscarawas County – after the Iroquoian Tuscarora people, who at one time had a settlement along the river of that name.
 Tuscarawas
 Tuscarawas River
 Wyandot County

Settlements

 Catawba Island - Name of a Siouan speaking tribe from North Carolina who participated in many wars and conflicts, some of which being in Ohio.
 Chickasaw - name of a tribe from Kentucky and Tennessee.
 Chillicothe - Shawnee. Chalakatha, one of the Shawnee bands.
 Chippewa Lake
 Choctaw Lake - name of a tribe from Mississippi.
 Conneaut
 Guyan - Shortened from French name for an Iroquoian Native tribe from West Virginia who were later absorbed into the Ohio Seneca—the Guyandotte (Also Little Mingo, Tiontatecaga. Not to be confused with Wyandot.)
 Metamora - Wampanoag?. Name comes from a play about a Native American from the Wampanoag people of New England.
 Mingo Junction - Mingo is common nickname for the Ohio Seneca people. Variant of Mingwe, what the Lenape once called the related Susquehannock Indians of Pennsylvania. 
 Mississinawa - Miami.  Name of a river tributary to the Wabash. From nimacihsinwi, "it lies on a slope."
 Montezuma - named for the last Tlatoani (Emperor) of the Aztec Empire, Moctezuma II.
 Nimishillen - Lenape. from Ni + Missilla, or Waters of the Black Alder.
 Ontario - Huron/ Wyandot. Named for Lake Ontario. Comes from Huron word which means Lake.
 Pataskala - Lenape. Unknown (May be of Siouan origin?)
 Piqua – Shawnee Pekowi, name of one of the five divisions of the Shawnee.
 Pusheta - Shawnee. Named after a local Chief.
 Pusheta Creek
 Powhatan Point - name of an Algonquian tribe from Virginia. The first Shawnee split away from them in the mid-1600s.
 Shawnee - Named for the Shawnee people
 Shawnee Hills (Greene County)
 Shawnee Hills (Delaware County)
 Texas - Named for the state, which derives its name from taysha, in Caddoan Native American language. Allegedly means friend. 
 Tontogany - Named after a local Chief. Most likely of Wyandot origin.
 Tymochtee - Wyandot. Allegedly means 'stream around the plains.'
 Wabash - Common name of a tribe from Indiana
 Wabash River
 Wapakoneta – from Shawnee Wa·po’kanite 'Place of White Bones' (wa·pa 'white'+(h)o’kani 'bone'+-ite locative suffix).
 Wauseon - Odawa. Named for Chief among the Potowatomi.

Bodies of water

 Kinnikinnick Creek - Algonquian origin, multiple Tribes. Word refers to a person's personal smoking tobacco mix, or any plant someone would mix with their own tobacco for flavor, medicinal purposes or to extend the life of their personal tobacco supply. Can also refer to a specific plant in English, known As Kinnikinnick in the Eastern US, Bear berry in Canada and Manzanita on the West Coast.
 Kokosing River - Lenape. From Gokhos + -ing, generally translating to "Owl, here." 
 Lake Erie
 Lake Mohawk - Named after tribe of the Iroquois Confederacy.
 River - Lenape. Allegedly means "Upon here is a deer lick," but this may be incorrect. May come from Ma + aney + -ing, or, roughly, "There is the path."
 Mahoning Valley
 Maumee River - Miami. A nickname or spelling variant for the Miami people. 
 Mohican River - Name of an Algonquian tribe from New York who were closely related to the Lenape.
 Olentangy River - Lenape. Allegedly, river of red paint.
 Pymatuning Lake – Lenape. Either corruption or variation on the word,  "Pemuteneyig."  Likely translation could be, "Upon this place, Towns are near."
 Shenango River – Seneca. Possibly from gesho:ne:gwa:h (keh-s-hoh-ney-g-wah) which means something along the lines of "It's right behind me."
 Walhonding River - Lenape. Unknown

References

Citations

Native American Ohio
Native American-related lists
Ohio-related lists
 
Native American history of Ohio